Thirteen or 13 may refer to:
 13 (number), the natural number following 12 and preceding 14
 One of the years 13 BC, AD 13, 1913, 2013

Music 
 13AD (band), an Indian classic and hard rock band

Albums
 13 (Black Sabbath album), 2013
 13 (Blur album), 1999
 13 (Borgeous album), 2016
 13 (Brian Setzer album), 2006
 13 (Die Ärzte album), 1998
 13 (The Doors album), 1970
 13 (Havoc album), 2013
 13 (HLAH album), 1993
 13 (Indochine album), 2017
 13 (Marta Savić album), 2011
 13 (Norman Westberg album), 2015
 13 (Ozark Mountain Daredevils album), 1997
 13 (Six Feet Under album), 2005
 13 (Suicidal Tendencies album), 2013
 13 (Solace album), 2003
 13 (Second Coming album), 2003
 13 (Ces Cru EP), 2012
 13 (Denzel Curry EP), 2017
 Thirteen (CJ & The Satellites album), 2007
 Thirteen (Emmylou Harris album), 1986
 Thirteen (Harem Scarem album), 2014
 Thirteen (James Reyne album), 2012
 Thirteen (Megadeth album), 2011
 Thirteen (October Noir album), 2019
 Thirteen (Robert Miles album), 2011
 Thirteen (Teenage Fanclub album), 1993
 Thirteens (album), by Leona Naess, 2008

Songs
 "13", a song by Anthrax from State of Euphoria
 "13", a song by D'espairsRay from Monsters
 "13", a song by Megadeth from Thirteen
 "13", a song by Perspects from the Miss Kittin album A Bugged Out Mix
 "13", a song by Tally Hall on the album Marvin's Marvelous Mechanical Museum
 Track 13, an untitled spoken-word track on the album Miscellaneous T by They Might Be Giants
 "Thirteen", one of the Number Pieces by John Cage
 "Thirteen" (song), 1972, by Big Star
 "Thirteen", a song by Danzig from 6:66 Satan's Child; first recorded by Johnny Cash
 "Thirteen", by C418 from Minecraft - Volume Alpha, 2011
 "Thirteen", by The Antlers from Hospice
 "Thir13teen", by Type O Negative from Life Is Killing Me

Fictional characters
 Thirteen (House) or Dr. Remy Hadley, in the television series House
 Thirteen (My Hero Academia), in the manga series My Hero Academia
 Doctor Thirteen, a DC Comics character
 Traci Thirteen, a DC Comics character
 13, a character from the Japanese anime Dorohedoro
 13, a cat in the animated series The Zimmer Twins

Film, television, and theater
 The Thirteen, a 1937 Soviet action film
 Thirteen (1974 film), a Hong Kong film
 Thirteen (2003 film), an American film
 13 (2006 film), a horror comedy released as Botched
 13 (2010 film), an English-language remake of 13 Tzameti
 13th (film), a 2016 American documentary
 13 (manga), 2014, by Sorachi Hideaki
 13 (musical), 2007, by Jason Robert Brown
 13: The Musical, 2022, a film adaptation of the stage musical
 13 (play), 2011 play
 13: Fear Is Real, a 2009 reality TV show
 Thirteen (TV series), a 2016 British TV series
 Thirteen (television station), or WNET, a television station licensed to Newark, New Jersey

Books
 13 (Armstrong novel), a 2012 novel in the Women of the Otherworld series by Kelley Armstrong
 13 (Zeitoun novel), a 2002 novel by Canadian author Mary-Lou Zeitoun
 Thirteen (comics), a story in 2000 AD
 Thirteen, the US title of Black Man, a 2007 science fiction novel
 Thirteen, a 2008 children's novel in the Winnie Years series by Lauren Myracle

Games
 13 (card game), a Vietnamese card game
 Thirteens, or Baroness, a solitaire card game
 13 (game) or XIII, a 2003 first-person shooter video game

Other uses 
 Thirteen (roller coaster), a steel roller coaster at Alton Towers in England
 List of highways numbered 13
 Runway 13, see Kai_Tak_Airport#Runway_13_approach
 First Aberdeen bus route 13

See also
 XIII (disambiguation)
 Number 13 (disambiguation)
 Th1rt3en (disambiguation)
 Thirteenth (disambiguation)